Foreign Affairs is a 1984 novel by American writer Alison Lurie, which concerns itself with American academics in England. The novel won multiple awards, including the Pulitzer Prize for Fiction in 1985, was nominated for the 1984 National Book Award, and was made into a television movie in 1993.

Plot summary

Unmarried fifty-four-year-old Virginia Miner (Vinnie), a professor at Corinth University who specializes in children's literature, is off to London for another research trip. She loves England and likes to feel that she fits in well there. She is hoping to produce an important new book about playground rhymes. However, she finds that her work has been trashed by a critic, L. D. Zimmern of Columbia, for whom she imagines monstrous dooms.

The author makes a point of telling us that Vinnie is not beautiful — perhaps rather homely — but that she has had her share of affairs nevertheless, and a brief marriage. Although she enjoys these flings, she has stopped believing that falling or being in love is a good thing.

A 'pro' at long flights, her serenity is ruffled by her seatmate, a garrulous married man from Tulsa, Chuck Mumpson. She puts him off by giving him Little Lord Fauntleroy to read. But smoking, drinking, loudly American Chuck is persistent, and ends up contacting her in London. He has been inspired by Little Lord Fauntleroy to want to trace his own family history. Vinnie slowly becomes involved with his project, and then with him.

Meanwhile, her young colleague Fred Turner has left his wife, Roo, at home for his own sabbatical in London, where he is researching John Gay. Fred and Roo have quarreled and he fears the marriage is over. He consoles himself with the affections of a beautiful TV actress, Lady Rosemary Radley, who gives him the entree into London high life. The exquisite but not so young Rosemary has never managed to have a really successful love relationship—though she is not resigned to this, as Vinnie is. Although Fred is very much in love with her, he cannot give her the commitment she wants, since he must return to Corinth to teach summer school.  Rosemary also has a concealed side to her personality that her friends wish to keep hidden from the public, and from journalists including contributors to Private Eye, who lampoon her as "Rosalie Raddled".  When Fred encounters this side of her, the friends close ranks and shut him out.

Quite by accident and with the encouragement of Chuck, Vinnie becomes an emissary for Fred's estranged wife in an improbable midnight walk on Hampstead Heath. What makes this favor more challenging for Vinnie is that Roo's father is the nefarious critic L. D. Zimmern.

Just as she begins to think Chuck's affections have cooled, because of his silence of several days duration, Vinnie is visited by his daughter who describes his sudden death while climbing the stairs of a small town hall. When an English friend speaks condescendingly of Chuck, Vinnie realizes with surprise that he loved her and she loved him. She returns to her life in Corinth, solitary and unloved, but altered for having loved and been loved.

Characters in Foreign Affairs
Virginia Miner (Vinnie) – professor at Corinth
Fred Turner – Miner's young colleague
Chuck Mumpson – American with whom Vinnie has an affair

Awards and nominations
The novel won the Pulitzer Prize for fiction in 1985, and was made into a made-for-TV movie. Foreign Affairs was also nominated for the 1984 National Book Award for fiction and the 1984 National Book Critics Circle Award for fiction.

Film, TV or theatrical adaptations
In 1993, Foreign Affairs was made into a TV movie written by Chris Bryant, starring Joanne Woodward, Brian Dennehy and Eric Stoltz.

References and notes

External links
 Photos of the first edition of Foreign Affairs

1984 American novels
Novels about writers
Novels set in London
Pulitzer Prize for Fiction-winning works
Random House books
American novels adapted into films
American novels adapted into television shows